Various organizations have awarded a season-long, points-based National Championship of open-wheel racing in the United States, first in 1905, and consistently since 1946. As of 2022, the top-level American open wheel racing championship is the IndyCar Series.

By season

AAA (1905–1955)

USAC (1956–1978) 

AAA ceased participation in auto racing at the end of the 1955 season. It cited a series of high-profile fatal accidents, namely Bill Vukovich at Indianapolis, and the Le Mans disaster. The national championship was taken over by the United States Auto Club (USAC), a new sanctioning body formed by the then-owner of the Indianapolis Motor Speedway, Tony Hulman.

USAC/CART (1979–1995) 

From 1979 to 1995, Indy car racing was sanctioned by two separate organizations. The Indianapolis 500, and a handful of other races continued to be sanctioned by USAC. CART was formed in 1979, and became the preeminent national championship series. The two entities conducted their own separate national championships, with USAC forming what was called the USAC Gold Crown Championship. The equipment utilized was largely identical between both organizations, and numerous drivers took part in events under both sanctions. After the 1983–84 USAC season, the Gold Crown Championship consisted solely of one race annually (the Indianapolis 500), rendering such championship winners indistinguishable from Indianapolis winners. IndyCar generally does not recognize winners of the USAC Gold Crown Championship as full season champions.

The Split (CART/IRL, 1996–2007) 

The Indy Racing League (IRL), founded in 1994 by Tony George, broke away from CART in 1996. George planned the IRL as a lower-cost, oval-focused alternative to CART, which had become technology-driven and dominated by a few wealthy multi-car teams. The IRL resumed using the IndyCar name in 2003, after a settlement with CART prohibiting its use had expired. CART declared bankruptcy in the same year, after the defection of a number of teams and engine manufacturers to the IRL, with its assets subsequently purchased by remaining team owners and continuing as Champ Car in 2004.

Reunification (IndyCar, 2008–present) 

IndyCar and Champ Car entered into merger negotiations in 2008, as both series worried they did not have enough participating cars to maintain their TV and sanctioning contract minimums. The two series came to an agreement in February 2008, with Champ Car declaring bankruptcy in order to facilitate the merger. IndyCar then purchased Champ Car's assets at auction, officially merging the two series and their respective histories.

By driver 

This list includes winners of all titles listed above, excluding the USAC Gold Crown Championship. Consequently, some years are listed twice.

Drivers in bold are entered in the 2022 IndyCar Series.

  Rick Mears also won three USAC Gold Crown Championships (1983–84, 1988, 1991).
  Al Unser also won the 1987 USAC Gold Crown Championship.
  Bobby Rahal also won the 1986 USAC Gold Crown Championship.
  Al Unser Jr. also won two USAC Gold Crown Championships (1992 and 1994).

By driver nationality

Records

Consecutive championships 

15 drivers have won consecutive National Championships. Only A. J. Foyt has achieved the feat on two separate occasions.

Drivers in bold were entered in the 2022 IndyCar Series.

References 

AAA Championship Car drivers

Champ Car champions
Champ Car drivers
IndyCar-related lists
IndyCar Series champions
IndyCar Series drivers